The Midget Ocean Racing Club (MORC) is an American association based in Severna Park, Maryland, that promotes and organizes ocean racing for small sailboats under a handicapping rule.

History
Founded in 1954, the club was formally organized as The Midget Ocean Racing Club, Inc., on 16 November 1972 as a Maryland domestic corporation. The club has a board of governors, comprising the commodores of each station (local MORC chapter), plus the national officers of the club.

In 1978 MORC moved to include one-design racing. The rule changes allowed separate starts for races when 20 or more boats of the same design are competing. The organization of one-design fleets was the jurisdiction of the local station. The Western Long Island Sound station was the lead chapter for this implementation.

By 1978 the club had 68 local "stations" and 2,500 members.

MORC measurement rule
The club administers the measurement rule that establishes the handicapping for participating boats.

Boats

Boats designed for MORC include:

Bluejacket 23
Bristol 29.9
Cal 24
C&C 25
C&C 29-2
Dolphin 24
G&S 27
Kirby 25
Harmony 22
Mariah 27
Merit 25
Mirage 24
Moore 24
Mustang 22
Mystic Mini-Ton
Newport 214
Olson 25
S2 7.9
S2 9.1
Santana 30/30
Paceship PY 23
Pearson 30
Pearson Electra
Pearson Ensign
Wavelength 24

See also
International Offshore Rule
Mini Ton class
Quarter Ton class
Half Ton class
Three-Quarter Ton class
One Ton class
Two Ton class

References

External links

Development sailing classes
Keelboats
Yacht clubs in the United States
1972 establishments in Maryland